Anisephyra ocularia is a species of moth in the family Geometridae.

References 

Geometridae
Moths described in 1775